Jason Edwards may refer to:
 Jason Edwards (musician), musician with Wolfsbane
 Jason Edwards (rugby league) (1969/1970–2022), rugby league footballer
 Jason Edwards (speedway rider) (born 2002), British speedway rider

See also
Jay Edwards (disambiguation)